The Extraordinary Adventures of , released as Adèle: Rise of the Mummy in Malaysia and Singapore, is a 2010 French fantasy adventure feature film written and directed by Luc Besson. It is loosely based on the comic book series The Extraordinary Adventures of Adèle Blanc-Sec by Jacques Tardi and, as in the comic, follows the eponymous writer and a number of recurring side characters in a succession of far-fetched incidents in 1910s Paris and beyond, in this episode revolving around parapsychology and ultra-advanced Ancient Egyptian technology, which both pastiche and subvert adventure and speculative fiction of the period. The primarily live-action film, shot in Super 35, incorporates much use of computer animation to portray its fanciful elements and contemporary action film special and visual effects within the form of the older-style adventure films they have largely superseded.

Plot
In Paris,  Professor Espérandieu is experimenting with telepathic techniques, and he unintentionally hatches a 136 million year-old pterosaur egg within the National Museum of Natural History. This results in the death of a former prefect (scandalously sharing a taxicab with a  showgirl) which though witnessed only by the then-drunk  sparks an epidemic of claimed sightings of the creature. The President of France orders the case be considered of utmost urgency by the National Police, only for it to be handed down to the bumbling Inspector Albert Caponi.

Adèle Blanc-Sec, a journalist and travel writer of some fame, finds herself involved after returning from Egypt, where she was searching for Ramesses II's mummified doctor/physician Patmosis. She wants to revive the mummy with the help of Espérandieu so the doctor can save her sister Agathe, who is comatose following an unfortunate tennis incident involving a hatpin. After a brief struggle with her nemesis, the mysterious Professor Dieuleveult, she retrieves the mummy and returns home. Her mission is complicated further by Espérandieu being on death row, having been blamed for the pterosaurs attacks, in lieu of Inspector Caponi and celebrity big game hunter Justin de Saint-Hubert having any success in taking down the beast itself. Andrej Zborowski, a researcher at the Jardin des Plantes who is enamored with Adèle, is able to lure the pterosaur into hiding. Adèle, riding the pterosaur, rescues Espérandieu moments before his execution.

Saint-Hubert fatally shoots the pterosaur along with Espérandieu, but not before Espérandieu is able to revive the mummy. The mummy reveals itself to be the Pharaoh's physicist ("I'm a nuclear physicist. I deal in figures, signs and equations.") and is unable to help her sister medically. Instead he accompanies Adèle to the Louvre, where they revive the rest of the Pharaoh's mummified court on display there, including the Pharaoh himself. The Pharaoh's doctor uses their advanced medical techniques to revive Agathe. The Pharaoh then decides he wants to see Paris, so the entire court wanders out into the night, scaring the ever-hapless Choupard yet again.

Adèle decides she needs a vacation to relax. As she boards the ship, the name RMS Titanic is revealed. Dieuleveult is then shown, sarcastically wishing her a "good journey".

In a mid-credits scene, Ménard pursues Saint-Hubert with a rifle, still outraged that Saint-Hubert shot the pterosaur. Ménard is arrested by Caponi as two gorillas stare menacingly at Saint-Hubert.

Cast
 
 Louise Bourgoin as Adèle Blanc-Sec
 Mathieu Amalric as Dieuleveult
 Philippe Nahon as Professor Ménard
 Gilles Lellouche as Inspector Albert Caponi
 Jean-Paul Rouve as Justin de Saint-Hubert
 Jacky Nercessian as Professor Espérandieu
 Nicolas Giraud as Andrej Zborowski
 Frédérique Bel as The Bourgeois
 Laure de Clermont as Agathe Blanc-Sec
 Swann Arlaud as The Elysée crier
 Youssef Hadji as Aziz
 Bernard Lanneau as the narrator

Production

Reception
On Rotten Tomatoes the film has a score of 85% based on reviews from 26 critics, with an average rating of 6.1/10. The site's critics consensus reads, "The Extraordinary Adventures of Adèle Blanc-Sec is an old-school adventure yarn with a distaff European - and generally rather delightful - spin."

Variety magazine called the film a "polished comicbook adaptation" and praised the performance of Louise Bourgoin's as the titular heroine. The reviewer complains that Besson's work is uneven, and the reviewer suggests that Besson would benefit from fresh collaborative voices, and a scissors for the overlong third act.

Angie Errigo of Empire magazine gave the film 4 stars, proclaiming that "Besson is back". Matthew Turner of ViewLondon gave the film 5 stars, writing: "impressively directed and beautifully designed, this is a highly entertaining and frequently funny action-adventure romp with a witty script, great special effects and a terrific central performance from rising star Louise Bourgoin".

Home media
Shout! Factory released a censored PG-rated version of the film in the United States on Blu-ray and DVD in August 2013. The original unedited version was released on Blu-ray in October 2013.

See also
 April and the Extraordinary World, a 2015 animated film, also based on the visual style of Tardi
 List of films based on French-language comics

References

External links
 

2010 films
2010s French-language films
2010s fantasy adventure films
2010s historical fantasy films
French fantasy adventure films
Films about dinosaurs
Films scored by Éric Serra
Films based on French comics
Films directed by Luc Besson
Films set in 1912
Films set in Egypt
Films set in ancient Egypt
Films set in Paris
Films shot in Egypt
Films with live action and animation
Mummy films
Live-action films based on comics
Pterosaurs in fiction
Science fantasy films
EuropaCorp films
French historical fantasy films
2010s French films